Hendrik Evert "Hein" Wigand Boele (born 24 November 1939 in Zwolle, Overijssel) is a Dutch voice actor.

Boele provides the voice of Elmo on Sesamstraat, the Dutch co-production of Sesame Street. Boele also dubbed Gobo Fraggle's voice for Fraggle Rock.

Selected filmography
 Pastorale 1943 (1978)

External links

1939 births
Dutch male film actors
Dutch male television actors
Dutch male voice actors
People from Zwolle
Living people
20th-century Dutch male actors